The Superior Hiking Trail, also known as the SHT, is a  long hiking trail in northeastern Minnesota that follows the rocky ridges overlooking Lake Superior for most of its length. The trail travels through forests of birch, aspen, pine, fir, and cedar. Hikers enjoy views of boreal forests, the Sawtooth Mountains, babbling brooks, rushing waterfalls, and abundant wildlife. The footpath is intended for hiking only. Motorized vehicles, mountain bikes, and horses are not allowed on the trail. Many people use the trail for long-distance hiking, and facilitating this purpose are 94 backcountry, fee-free campsites.

History
Construction of the Superior Hiking Trail began in the mid-1980s, and the trail now extends  from the Minnesota-Wisconsin border southwest of Duluth to the Canada–US border. Inspiration for building the trail came from the Appalachian Trail, which extends from Georgia to Maine. The Superior Hiking Trail Association (SHTA) was formed in 1986 to manage the construction, planning, and day-to-day care of the trail. The SHTA received several grants from the State of Minnesota, three of which were from the Legislative Commission on Minnesota Resources. This money helped jump start the construction of the trail and funded construction for the first few years. In 1987, the trail had an opening ceremony at Britton Peak to celebrate the beginning of construction. The ceremony included a log-cutting event and many state government officials and SHTA founders attended. Three years later, in August 1990, the trail had reached a half-way mark and another celebration was held. That celebration included a  hike for about a dozen brave hikers who completed it in 12 days. Since 1991, a  ultramarathon known as the "Superior 100", along with several other races, has been hosted annually on the Superior Hiking Trail. In 1995, Paul Hlina, who was paralyzed from the waist down, hiked the entire trail on crutches and is now known as the first hiker to thru-hike the trail. He raised $16,000 in pledges for the Superior Hiking Trail Association, the non-profit organization which maintains the trail. Trail construction and improvements continued, and in 2016, the 30th year of trail construction, the Superior Hiking Trail became a continuous footpath from the Minnesota-Wisconsin border to the 270 Degree Overlook near the Canada–US border.

Sections of the trail

There are two primary sections to the Superior Hiking Trail.

The Duluth section of the trail comprises  and starts southwest of the city of Duluth at the Minnesota-Wisconsin border. The trail extends to the northeast through Jay Cooke State Park, the Spirit Mountain Recreation Area, Brewer Park, Enger Park, the Historic Downtown Area, Canal Park, the Lakewalk, and Hartley Nature Center, before it ends at a trailhead located on Martin Road on the north side of the city. The Duluth section is particularly suited for day hiking. There is only one backcountry campground, located near the Minnesota-Wisconsin border, along the Duluth section.

From there, the trail extends to the northeast along Lake Superior through seven state parks, including Gooseberry Falls State Park, Split Rock Lighthouse State Park and Tettegouche State Park. This section of the SHT passes near the towns of Lutsen and Grand Marais, and ends just before the Canada–United States border. The North Shore section provides backcountry experiences and is utilized by both day hikers and backpackers. The Superior Hiking Trail Association maintains 93 backcountry campgrounds along the North Shore section, and a traditional thru-hike of the Superior Hiking Trail typically spans this  section. The total elevation gain along the North Shore section is 37,800 feet (11,500 m) and the elevation loss is 37,400 feet (11,400 m) for a northbound hiker.

The Superior Hiking Trail Association

The Superior Hiking Trail Association (SHTA) builds, promotes and maintains the trail. It is a Minnesota-based non-profit corporation with more than 3200 members. The association produces a quarterly newsletter called The Ridgeline for its members which contains noteworthy news of the trail, trail volunteer bios, and association financial information. The most visible activities of the SHTA are the popular organized hikes featuring leaders with interpretive skills, such as naturalists, geologists, photographers, and historians and ranging from day hikes to backpacking trips of several days' duration.

The trail was mostly built by crews of people that were hired from local towns or by the Minnesota Conservation Corps. In addition, the SHTA coordinates the efforts of numerous volunteers who assist with trail and campground construction and maintenance. These volunteers include interested individuals, scout troops, and other outdoor organizations. Some groups have chosen to adopt a section of the trail to maintain, while others participate in scheduled maintenance hikes.

Accolades

In December 2000, Backpacker Magazine named the Superior Hiking Trail the trail with the "Best Trail/Camp/Shelter Conditions," the trail with the "Best Signage" in the country, and one of the most scenic trails in the nation. Writer and backpacker Andrew Skurka says the Superior Hiking Trail is one of his ten favorite hikes in America. In 2005, Reader's Digest listed the Superior Hiking Trail as one of the "5 Best Hikes in America," and in 2015, The Guardian included the trail among the "top 10 long-distance hiking trails in the US."

See also
 Long-distance trails in the United States

References

External links

 Superior Hiking Trail Association
 Superior Hiking Trail from Explore Minnesota
 Journals and Photos from The Superior Hiking Trail

Protected areas of Cook County, Minnesota
Hiking trails in Minnesota
Protected areas of Lake County, Minnesota
Long-distance trails in the United States
National Recreation Trails in Minnesota
Protected areas of St. Louis County, Minnesota
1980s establishments in Minnesota
Protected areas established in the 1980s